The higher education system in India includes both private and public universities. Public universities are supported by the Government of India and the state governments, while private universities are mostly supported by various bodies and societies. Universities in India are recognised by the University Grants Commission (UGC), which draws its power from the University Grants Commission Act, 1956. In addition, 15 Professional Councils are established, controlling different aspects of accreditation and co-ordination.

The types of universities include:
 Central universities, or Union universities, are established by an Act of Parliament and are under the purview of the Department of Higher Education in the Ministry of Education. , the list of central universities published by the UGC includes 54 active central universities.
 State universities are run by the state government of each of the states and territories of India and are usually established by a local legislative assembly act. , the UGC lists 459 active state universities. The oldest establishment date listed by the UGC is 1857, shared by the University of Calcutta, the University of Madras and the University of Mumbai. Most State Universities are affiliating universities administering many affiliated colleges (often located in small towns) that typically offer a range of undergraduate courses, but may also offer post-graduate courses. More established colleges may even offer PhD programs in some departments with the approval of the affiliating university.
 Deemed university, or "Deemed to be University", is a status of autonomy granted by the Department of Higher Education on the advice of the UGC, under Section 3 of the UGC Act. , the UGC lists 127 institutes which were granted the deemed to be university status. According to this list, the first institute to be granted deemed university status was Indian Institute of Science, which was granted this status on 12 May 1958. In many cases, the same listing by the UGC covers several institutes. For example, the listing for Homi Bhabha National Institute covers the Institute of Mathematical Sciences, the Indira Gandhi Centre for Atomic Research and other institutes.
 Private universities are approved by the UGC. They can grant degrees but they are not allowed to have off-campus affiliated colleges. , the UGC consolidated list of universities lists 430 private universities.

, these four types of universities total 1070 universities together. There are universities of some kind in each of the 28 states of India as well as five of the eight union territories: Chandigarh, Delhi, Jammu and Kashmir, Ladakh and Puducherry. The state with the most universities is Gujarat with 94 universities, and Gujarat has also by far the most private universities, 60 in number. Tamil Nadu is the state with the most deemed universities, numbering 28, and West Bengal  has the most state universities, 37. Delhi has seven central universities, the largest number of all the states and territories.

 Institutes of National Importance Apart from the above universities, other institutions are granted the permission to autonomously award degrees. However, they do not affiliate colleges and are not officially called "universities" but "autonomous organizations" or "autonomous institutes". They fall under the administrative control of the Department of Higher Education. These organisations include the Indian Institutes of Information Technology, Indian Institutes of Technology, the National Institutes of Technology, the All India Institutes of Medical Sciences, the Indian Institutes of Science Education and Research, the Indian Institutes of Management and other autonomous institutes. These institutes are not listed below.

Also not listed are institutes which are under the control of the professional councils, without an approval of the UGC, e.g. Agricultural Universities, which are under the control of the Agricultural Education Division of the Indian Council of Agricultural Research (ICAR), one of the professional councils.

The University Grants Commission (UGC) has also maintains a list fake Universities operating in India. UGC has said that these 24 self-styled, unrecognised institutions functioning in contravention of the UGC Act have been declared as fake and are not entitled to confer any degrees. , the list contains 24 institutions.

Universities by state and type
The table below is correct .

See also
 List of autonomous higher education institutes in India
 List of central universities in India
 List of deemed universities in India
 List of private universities in India
 List of state universities in India

Notes

References 

 universities
 
India